Inazuma Eleven is a 2008 to 2011 Japanese animation television series based on Level-5's video game series of the same name. The animated series was produced by OLM under the direction of Katsuhito Akiyama and consists of 127 episodes.

An animation television series based on the game aired on the TV Tokyo network from October 5, 2008 until April 27, 2011. The series was produced by Level-5 in conjunction with TV Tokyo and OLM.

The first 26 episodes were formerly available in the United States on Hulu. The first three episodes can also be freely viewed via the Nintendo 3DS eShop, which were released alongside the North American release of the first video game.

Music 
Thirteen pieces of theme music are used through the entire series—six opening themes performed by T-Pistonz+KMC and seven closing themes. The opening theme for the first 26 episodes is "Tachiagari-yo". For episodes 27 to 54, the opening theme is "Maji de Kansha!". "Tsunagari-yo" is the opening theme for episodes 55 to 67. The opening theme for episodes 68 through 87 is "Katte Nakou ze!". The opening theme for episodes 88 to 107 is "GOOD Kita!". And the final opening theme starting from episode 108 is "Bokura no Goal!". The closing theme for the first 26 episodes is "Seishun Oden" performed by Twel'v. The next five closing themes were performed by Berryz Kobo, the first "Seishun Bus Guide" was the closing theme for episodes 27 to 50. Episodes 51 to 67's closing theme is "Ryūsei Boy". For episodes 68 through 87, the closing theme is "Otakebi Boy WAO!". "Maji Bomber!!" is the closing theme for episodes 88 to 101, and "Shining Power" is the closing theme for episodes 102 to 112. The final closing theme from episode 113 to the end of the series is "Mata ne... no Kisetsu" and was performed by Inazuma All Stars, consisting of Junko Takeuchi, Yuka Nishigaki, Hiroyuki Yoshino, Hirofumi Nojima, and Mamoru Miyano.

The anime also features a score by Yasunori Mitsuda, who rearranged many of the tracks from the original game.

Broadcast and ratings 
The series was first broadcast on TV Tokyo in Japan between October 5, 2008 and April 27, 2011. Inazuma Eleven first appeared in Video Research's top ten anime series during the week of December 29, 2008 to January 4, 2009 when episode 14,  received a 4.0 share. Its viewers ratings peaked during the week of July 5–11, 2010 when episode 90, received a 6.2 share. By the final episode, the view share was 4.8.

A second series, immediately followed the first series and was broadcast between May 4, 2011 and April 11, 2012. A third series,  began airing on April 18, 2012.  began airing on May 8, 2013, immediately following Inazuma Eleven GO: Chrono Stone.

Home media 
Twenty-eight DVD compilations of three to four episodes each were released by Geneon Entertainment. The first compilation was released on February 20, 2008.

Episodes

Season 1 (2008–2009)

Season 2 (2009–2010)

Season 3 (2010–2011)

References

External links 
 

Inazuma Eleven (anime)
2008 Japanese television series debuts
2011 Japanese television series endings
Japanese-language television shows
2008 anime television series debuts
Anime television series based on video games
Association football in anime and manga
Japanese children's animated sports television series
OLM, Inc.
TV Tokyo original programming
TVB